Paaras is a bilingual (Urdu and English) family magazine published each month from Canada for the large Pakistani Canadian community in North America by Meridian Multimedia Network Inc. The headquarters is in Mississauga, Ontario.

History and profile
The project was founded in 2002 by a team of scholars, writers and journalists including Shah Baleeghuddin and Ibtehaj Khurram, under the leadership of internationally renowned Pakistani-Canadian intellectual and a former member of Pakistan’s parliament Shah Baleeghuddin, Paaras publishes an interesting mix of contents including integrating commentaries on current affairs, in-depth coverage of critical issues, humour and poetry. Its first issue was published in October 2002.

Paaras has played an instrumental role in highlighting the new works of Canadian Urdu writers, poets and columnists. Since its inception, Paaras has published the work of Canada's notable Urdu writers, poets and columnists, including Sultan Jamil Nasim, Sheen Nousheen, Rahim Anjaan, Rakhshinda Kaukab, Ishtiaq Talib, Wasi Mazhar Nadvi, Khalil Yousuf, Karamatullah Ghauri, Razaul Jabbar, Muneef Ash’ar, Taslim Elahi Zulfi, Tabassum Bano, etc.

Notable writers, poets and columnists have praised Paaras for its excellent mix of contents particularly articles on current affairs, short stories and humour.

References

External links
 Paaras Magazine Website
 Meridian Multimedia Network Inc.
 https://web.archive.org/web/20080111224809/http://sultanjamilnasim.com/

2002 establishments in Ontario
Cultural magazines published in Canada
English-language magazines
Magazines established in 2002
Magazines published in Ontario
Mass media in Mississauga
Monthly magazines published in Canada
Mass media of Pakistani diaspora
Pakistani-Canadian culture
Urdu-language magazines